The Ukrainian National Tchaikovsky Academy of Music, formerly Kyiv Conservatory, is a national music tertiary academy in Kyiv, Ukraine. Its courses include postgraduate education.

History
The Kyiv Conservatory was founded on 3 November 1913 at the Kyiv campus of the Music College of the Russian Musical Society. The organization of the conservatory was spearheaded by Sergei Rachmaninoff and Alexander Glazunov. The first directors were V. Pukhalsky (1913) and Reinhold Glière (1914–1920). In 1925, the junior classes were separated from the conservatory to form a Music College, while the senior classes were merged into the formerly private Music and Drama Institute of Mykola Lysenko (today the Kyiv National I. K. Karpenko-Kary Theatre, Cinema and Television University). Viktor Kosenko taught at both institutions.

The conservatory was revived when Kyiv once again became the capital of Ukraine in 1934. The Music and Drama Institute of Mykola Lysenko was dissolved and its music department was merged back with the Music College, while the drama department served as the basis for creation of the Kyiv State Theater Institute of Les Kurbas. In 1938, the conservatory received the Order of Lenin award. In 1940, the conservatory was named after the Russian composer Pyotr Ilyich Tchaikovsky, who was of partly Ukrainian heritage. In 1995, the President of Ukraine elevated the conservatory's status, and renamed it the Petro Tchaikovsky National Music Academy of Ukraine. In 2022, after Russian invasion, the removal of Tchaikovsky's name was proposed and largely disputed.

The conservatory occupies a building built in the 1890s as the Hotel Continental (built by architects Eduard Bradtman and Georg Schleifer). The building was destroyed during World War II, but was rebuilt in 1955, when a concert hall was added (architects L. Katok and Ya. Krasny). It is located on Horodetsky street 1-3/11.

Rectors
 1913–1914 Vladimir Pukhalskiy
 1914–1920 Reinhold Glière
 1920–1922 Felix Blumenfeld
 1922–1926 Kostiantyn Mykhailov
 1926–1934 unknown
 1934–1948 Abram Lufer (including the evacuation period)
 1948–1954 Oleksandr Klymov
 1954–1968 Andriy Shtoharenko
 1968–1974 Ivan Lyashenko
 1974–1983 Mykola Kondratyuk
 1983–2004 Oleg Tymoshenko
 2004– 2018 Volodymyr Rozhok
 2018– Maksym Tymoshenko

Honorary Professors of the Academy 
 Riccardo Muti
 Placido Domingo
 Jack Ma
 Oleh V. Krysa
 Esteban Valverde Corrales
 Mykola Suk
 Ye Xiaogang
 Jerzy Stankiewicz

References

External links 
Official site of the conservatory

 
Music schools in Ukraine
Universities and colleges in Kyiv
Music in Kyiv
Maidan Nezalezhnosti
Educational institutions established in 1913
1913 establishments in the Russian Empire
National universities in Ukraine